The Spitalfields Mathematical Society was founded in 1717 by Joseph Middleton.
The society had 64 members when it was established, and at first meetings were held in the Monmouth's Head, a public house in the Spitalfields district of London. Fellows of the society were drawn from artisans and craftsmen such as weavers, apothecaries, brewers, ironmongers, stockbrokers, and makers of optical and mathematical instruments. Well-known members included John Canton, John Dollond, Thomas Simpson, John Crosley, John Tatum, Francis Baily, and Benjamin Gompertz.

It merged with the Royal Astronomical Society in 1846.

The name lives on in the "Spitalfields Days" organised by, among others, the Isaac Newton Institute, Cambridge, Mathematics Research Centre, Warwick, and International Centre for Mathematical Sciences, Edinburgh.

References 

 http://www.mernick.org.uk/thhol/mathematical.html
 http://technicaleducationmatters.org/2009/05/14/the-spitalfields-mathematical-society-1717-to-1846/
 Cawthorne. H.H. ‘The Spitalfields Mathematical Society’. (1717 – 1845). Journal of Adult Education. Vol. 111. No. 2. (April 1929). Cassels.
 J.W.S. ‘The Spitalfields Mathematical Society’ Bulletin of LMS. 11 p. 241 – 258. 1979.

Mathematical societies
1717 establishments in England
Defunct learned societies of the United Kingdom
1846 disestablishments in England
Royal Astronomical Society
Spitalfields